Christopher Hope (born 24 October 1971) is a British journalist. He is The Daily Telegraphs associate editor (politics). Nicknamed Chopper, he presents The Telegraphs weekly interview podcast Chopper's Politics. He was previously The Telegraphs chief political correspondent and assistant editor.

Early life
Hope was born on 24 October 1971. His parents are Michael and Caroline. He was educated at Shrewsbury School. He has wanted to be a journalist since being a child, and did work experience at the Formby Times. He attended the University of Bristol, studying Politics and International Relations, before going to the Cardiff School of Journalism, Media and Cultural Studies in the mid-1990s to undertake a post-grad in journalism.

Career
Hope formerly worked for PrintWeek, Construction News, The Scotsman and The Herald.

In 2001 Hope helped found a daily financial newspaper in Scotland, Business AM, which folded the following year. He was hired by The Daily Telegraphs City editor Neil Collins in 2003 to be part of its business team, in which he was business correspondent and industry editor. In 2008 he was promoted from home affairs editor to Whitehall editor, thus entering the politics team, and subsequently moved to the role of senior political correspondent. He was part of the team of Daily Telegraph journalists that broke the news of the parliamentary expenses scandal. He claims to have coined the term flipping to denote the alleged practice of MPs re-designating second homes.

Hope co-wrote the book Conundrum with Richard Bacon, a detailed account of the failings of UK public sector and government projects.

In 2013 he was chairman of the Parliamentary Press Gallery.

Hope was booed and jeered at the UK Independence Party (UKIP) 2015 general election campaign launch after asking about why the only black face on the party's manifesto was on the overseas aid page. Some of the party's supporters accused him of racism on social media after the launch ended. James Kirkup wrote that "the party's actions could have a chilling effect on journalistic scrutiny" and called on UKIP to apologise for Hope's "disgraceful treatment".

In 2019 and 2020 he was chairman of the Lobby.

In an interview in 2019 he clarified his and The Telegraphs relationship with Prime Minister and former columnist Boris Johnson.

Hope's suggestion of a Brexit 50p coin led to the coin being minted.

Hope was formerly The Daily Telegraphs chief political correspondent and assistant editor. He has presented the BBC Radio 4 programme Week in Westminster. 

Hope is The Daily Telegraphs associate editor (politics). He presents Chopper's Politics (formerly Chopper's Brexit Podcast), a weekly podcast featuring interviews with politicians and commentators. He is also the writer of the Peterborough diary.

In February 2023, it was announced that Hope would be leaving The Telegraph after 20 years, and joining GB News.

Personal life
Hope is married to Sarah Hope.  They have one son, Barnaby, and two daughters, Sapphire and Pollyanna. They have a Jack Russell named Queenie.

Pollyanna is a student at London Contemporary Dance School, having had a ballet-specific prosthetic leg fitted; she featured in the Toyota advertising campaign for the 2022 Winter Olympics and 2022 Winter Paralympics.

In April 2007, Hope found that his family had been hit by a bus in South London, leaving Sarah badly injured and killing her mother Elizabeth. Their daughter Pollyanna lost her right leg in the crash, leading Sarah and her sister to create Elizabeth's Legacy of Hope, a charity devoted to helping young amputees in developing countries. Hope and Sarah moved to Norfolk after the crash, and were affected in the long-term through suffering from post-traumatic stress disorder. The bus driver was found guilty of death by dangerous driving and jailed for four years. In April 2016, Transport for London launched the Sarah Hope Line to provide advice and support to people affected by serious incidents on London's transport network.

Tim Shipman, a fellow journalist and friend, helped give Hope the nickname Chopper.

Bibliography

References

1971 births
Living people
British male journalists
21st-century British journalists
British newspaper journalists
British political journalists
The Daily Telegraph people
Alumni of Cardiff University
The Scotsman people
The Herald (Glasgow) people